Sir Frederick Charles Thomson, 1st Baronet,  (27 May 1875 – 21 April 1935) was a Scottish Unionist politician and lawyer.

Life 
He was the third son of James Wishart Thomson of Glenpark, Balerno, Midlothian; James was a son of William Thomson, co-founder of the Ben Line.

Educated at Edinburgh Academy, University College, Oxford and at the University of Edinburgh, he was called to the Scottish bar in 1901, and to the English bar in 1904.

He served in Egypt as a lieutenant with the Scottish Horse and in Salonika with the Lovat Scouts, where he was severely wounded.

He was Unionist Member of Parliament for Aberdeen South from 1918 until his death.

He was Parliamentary Private Secretary to Sir Robert Horne, 1919–1922, and a Junior Lord of the Treasury from February–April 1923. He was appointed a King's Counsel in 1923 and appointed as Solicitor General for Scotland from April 1923 to 1924. He was again a Junior Lord of the Treasury from 1924 to 1928, Vice-Chamberlain of HM Household, 1928–1929 and September–November 1931, and Treasurer of the Household from 1931 until his death in 1935.

He was created a baronet in 1929, of Glendarroch, in the county of Midlothian. He was succeeded in the baronetcy by his son Douglas, who was elected as MP for Aberdeen South in the May 1935 by-election after his death.

He is buried with his wife Constance Margaret Hotson (1880–1970) and son in the north-east corner of Dean Cemetery in Edinburgh.

References

Sources 
Thomson Baronets

External links 
 

1875 births
1935 deaths
Thomason, Frederick Charles, 1st Baronet
People educated at Edinburgh Academy
Alumni of University College, Oxford
Alumni of the University of Edinburgh
Unionist Party (Scotland) MPs
Members of the Parliament of the United Kingdom for Scottish constituencies
Members of the Parliament of the United Kingdom for Aberdeen constituencies
UK MPs 1918–1922
UK MPs 1922–1923
UK MPs 1923–1924
UK MPs 1924–1929
UK MPs 1929–1931
UK MPs 1931–1935
Solicitors General for Scotland
Scottish Horse officers
Lovat Scouts officers
Treasurers of the Household
British Army personnel of World War I
Members of the Faculty of Advocates
Scottish King's Counsel
20th-century King's Counsel
20th-century Scottish lawyers